Edward Gibbon Swann (13 August 1823 – 20 December 1900) was an English first-class cricketer active 1843–48 who played for Kent. He was born in Geneva and died in Burgess Hill. He played in 14 first-class matches.

References

1823 births
1900 deaths
English cricketers
Kent cricketers
Marylebone Cricket Club cricketers
Gentlemen of Kent cricketers
Sportspeople from Geneva